Omphalotropis cookei is a species of minute salt marsh snail with an operculum, a terrestrial gastropod mollusk, or micromollusk, in the family Assimineidae. This species occurs in Guam and the Northern Mariana Islands.

References

Omphalotropis
Assimineidae
Gastropods described in 1949
Taxonomy articles created by Polbot